Hosilu Mettida Hennu is a 1976 Indian Kannada-language film, directed by V. T. Thyagarajan and produced by T. H. Rama Murthy. The film stars Vishnuvardhan, Aarathi, Leelavathi and Ambareesh. The film has musical score by T. G. Lingappa.

Cast
Vishnuvardhan
Aarathi
Leelavathi
Ambareesh
Krishna Kumari
T. N. Balakrishna

Soundtrack
The music was composed by T. G. Lingappa.

References

External links
 

1976 films
1970s Kannada-language films
Films scored by T. G. Lingappa